Jesús David José Méndez (born 1 August 1984) is an Argentine football midfielder who currently plays for Independiente Rivadavia.

Career
Méndez made his league debut for River Plate in a 2–1 away win at Atlético Rafaela on 3 March 2004. In 2006 he had a loan spell with Olimpo, before joining St. Gallen of Switzerland in 2007. Méndez returned to Argentina in 2008 to play for Rosario Central.

In January 2010 he signed for Boca Juniors. After two loan spells playing again for Rosario Central, the midfielder joined Independiente in 2014.

Méndez played two years in Mexico with Toluca, before returning to Argentina to play for Vélez Sarsfield in the second semester of the 2017–18 Argentine Primera División.

34-year old Méndez announced his retirement at the beginning of 2019, after playing some games with Vélez. However, a year later, at the beginning of 2020, Méndez returned to the pitch and joined Deportivo Maipú where he managed to play some games before the start of the quarantine and the suspension of all tournaments due to the COVID-19 pandemic. His contract at Maipú expired in June 2020 and he then joined Independiente Rivadavia a few months later.

References

External links
 Guardian statistics
 

1984 births
Living people
Sportspeople from Mendoza Province
Argentine footballers
Argentine expatriate footballers
Association football midfielders
Argentine Primera División players
Primera Nacional players
Swiss Super League players
Liga MX players
Club Atlético River Plate footballers
Olimpo footballers
Rosario Central footballers
Boca Juniors footballers
Club Atlético Independiente footballers
Club Atlético Vélez Sarsfield footballers
FC St. Gallen players
Deportivo Maipú players
Deportivo Toluca F.C. players
Independiente Rivadavia footballers
Argentine expatriate sportspeople in Switzerland
Argentine expatriate sportspeople in Mexico
Expatriate footballers in Switzerland
Expatriate footballers in Mexico
Pan American Games gold medalists for Argentina
Pan American Games medalists in football
Footballers at the 2003 Pan American Games
Argentina international footballers
Medalists at the 2003 Pan American Games